The 1996 Castleford Tigers season was the club's 1st year in the Super League. The club finished in 9th place. Castleford also competed in the Challenge Cup, but were knocked out in the Fourth Round by St. Helens.

Table

Squad
Statistics include appearances and points in the Super League and Challenge Cup.

Transfers

In

Out

References

External links

Castleford Tigers - Rugby League Project

Castleford Tigers seasons
Castleford Tigers